Randall Hansen is a political scientist and historian at the University of Toronto, where he has held a Canada Research Chair in Political Science since 2005. He is the Director of the Centre for European, Russian, and Eurasian Studies at the Munk School of Global Affairs and Public Policy. Hansen taught at the Queen Mary University of London and the University of Oxford (where he was a tutorial fellow at Merton College) before taking up his current position.

His fields of research are migration and citizenship, eugenics and population policy, and the effect of war on civilian populations. He has authored three books, Citizenship and Immigration in Postwar Britain, Fire and Fury: the Allied Bombing of Germany 1942-1945, and Disobeying Hitler: German Resistance after Valkyrie.

Hansen was co-editor (with Matthew J. Gibney) of Immigration and Asylum: From 1900 to the Present. He is co-author (with Desmond King) of Sterilized by the State: Eugenics, Race and the Population Scare in 20th Century North America.

Fire and Fury was a Canadian bestseller, described by Vice as "well-received," and was nominated for a Governor's General award, specifically the Governor General's Literary Award for Non-Fiction in 2009.  Additionally, he has contributed numerous articles to academic journals.

In 2018, sales of Fire and Fury surged upon the publication of Michael Wolff's best-selling book of the same title about the Presidency of Donald Trump. Some people bought Hansen's book by mistake, while others became aware of it because of the publicity over the Wolff book.  The Guardian reported Hansen's reaction to the interest in his book about the consequences of war:

"And we’re talking about that at a moment when we have this warmongering, unstable, deranged demagogue in the White House," he said. "So that coincidence actually makes me happier than the sales."

Hansen was the interim director of the Munk School of Global Affairs for the period June 1, 2017 to January 31, 2020, succeeding Stephen Toope.

References

External links
 Biography at the Munk School of Global Affairs & Public Policy

Academic staff of the University of Toronto
Living people
21st-century Canadian historians
Canadian male non-fiction writers
Canadian political scientists
Year of birth missing (living people)
Canada Research Chairs
Fellows of Merton College, Oxford